Asterropteryx ensifera, known commonly as the Miller's damsel , is a species of marine fish in the family Gobiidae.

It is widespread throughout the tropical waters of the Indo-Pacific area; the Red Sea included.

This is a small size fish that can reach a maximum size of 3 cm length.

References

External links
Fishbase.org
 

ensifera
Fish described in 1874